Pradeep Palluruthy is a Malayalam singer. He is from Cochin and is a singer in the Malayalam film industry. He has sung around 125 films. Pradeep Palluruthy's first Malayalam movie song was 'Punnyavanisahakkinundayi Randu Makkal' from Thommanum Makkalum. Even though Pradeep's directorial debut failed to materialize, he made his debut as an actor with Swapnasundari.

References

External links
 

Living people
Indian male playback singers
Malayalam playback singers
Malayali people
Singers from Kochi
Year of birth missing (living people)